Onslow Stearns (August 30, 1810 – December 29, 1878) was an American businessman and politician who served as the 32nd governor of New Hampshire.

Biography
Stearns was born in Billerica, Massachusetts on August 30, 1810.  He attended the local schools of his hometown, and moved to Boston, where he clerked in several stores in preparation for a business career.

After moving to Concord, Stearns established himself in business.  Starting as a construction contractor in partnership with his brother, Stearns eventually became a manager and executive, and was active in several different railroads, including the Lowell and Nashua, Northern Railroad of New Hampshire, Vermont Central Railway, and Old Colony Railroad.

In 1857 Stearns received the honorary degree of Master of Arts from Dartmouth College.

Stearns became active in politics as a Republican, serving in the New Hampshire State Senate from 1862 to 1864. He served as the Senate's President pro tempore in 1863, and was a Delegate to the 1864 Republican National Convention.

Stearns ran successfully for governor in 1869 and was reelected in 1870.  During his time in office the state created a board of agriculture, taxes and deficits necessitated by New Hampshire's participation in the American Civil War were lowered, and the state government continued to promote the development of railroads and manufacturing business.

After leaving office Stearns retired from politics and resumed his business interests.  He died in Concord, New Hampshire on December 29, 1878, and was buried in the Blossom Hill Cemetery in Concord.

Stearns' daughter Mary was the wife of General John R. Brooke.  His daughter Grace was the mother of General Onslow S. Rolfe.

References

External links
Stearns at New Hampshire's Division of Historic Resources
Onslow Stearns at National Governors Association

Memorial of Onslow Stearns, Concord, N. H.  1879.

1810 births
1878 deaths
Republican Party governors of New Hampshire
American Unitarians
People from Billerica, Massachusetts
Presidents of the New Hampshire Senate
Republican Party New Hampshire state senators
19th-century American politicians